Hebden is a Parish of Ularara County in north west New South Wales.

Located at   10 km west of Wanaaring, New South Wales the main  economic activity of the parish is agriculture. The climate is semi-arid, featuring low rainfall, very hot summer temperatures and cool nights in winter.

The Parish is on Possum Creek, a tributary of the Paroo River.

History
Hebden Parish is on the traditional lands of the Paaruntyi people and The Burke and Wills expedition were the first Europeans to the area.

Climate 
The climate is semi-arid, featuring low rainfall, very hot summer temperatures and cool nights in winter. The parish has a Köppen climate classification of BWh (Hot desert). A minimum temperature of -3.9 °C was recorded in July 1997.

References

Parishes of Ularara County
Far West (New South Wales)